The Fox Family is a 2006 South Korean film.

Plot 
Disguising themselves as humans, a family of kumiho travel from their home in the mountains to the city. The kumiho can only truly become human if they consume a human liver during an eclipse that occurs once every thousand years, and with just thirty days to go they open a circus in the hope of attracting some victims. But the only person they succeed in capturing is conman Gi-dong, and things get complicated when the family's eldest daughter falls in love with him. In addition, a series of murders in the city brings the family under suspicion from a local police department.

Cast 
 Joo Hyun ... Father fox
 Park Jun-gyu ... Gi-dong, camera man
 Ha Jung-woo ... Son fox
 Park Si-yeon ... Older daughter fox
 Ko Joo-yeon ... Younger daughter fox
 Sunwoo Yong-nyeo ... Mother fox
 Park Chul-min ... detective
 Woo Hyun ... Mr. Hong
 Yoon Hyeon-sook ... Ms. Hwang
 Wang Ji-hye ... convenience store girl
 Kang Yu-mi ... female reporter
 Kim Hee-ra ... man living in the container
 Byun Joo-yeon ... Gi-dong's daughter
 Byun Shin-ho ... elderly lady Oh
 Lee Bong-kyu ... bathhouse owner
 Hong Gyung-yeon ... middle aged woman in cabaret
 Kim Young-woong ... reporter

Release 
The Fox Family was released in South Korea on 27 September 2006, and on its opening weekend was ranked seventh at the box office with 39,025 admissions.

In August 2007, The Fox Family was screened at the 3rd Jecheon International Music & Film Festival.

References

External links 
  
 
 
 

2006 films
2000s Korean-language films
South Korean musical comedy films
2000s musical comedy films
2006 comedy films
2000s South Korean films
Myung Films films